Sarqan-e Sofla (also Romanized as Sārqān-e Soflá; also known as Sārqān-e Pā’īn, Sārgān Pā’īn, Sarqān, and Shargu) is a village in Shakhen Rural District, in the Central District of Birjand County, South Khorasan Province, Iran. At the 2016 census, its population was 21, in 8 families.

References 

Populated places in Birjand County